Escalima regularis is a species of bivalve mollusc in the family Limidae, the file shells or file clams.

References
 

Limidae
Bivalves of New Zealand
Molluscs described in 1955